The 1972 World 600, the 13th running of the event, was a NASCAR Winston Cup Series racing event that was held on May 28, 1972, at Charlotte Motor Speedway in Concord, North Carolina. Wendell Scott was promised a good car, what he actually got was a hunk of junk. In practice, the car was 9 miles per hour off the pace; this led to jeers from his fellow drivers that he just could not drive the best level of equipment that was available at the time. Bobby Allison climbed in the car afterward and went the same speed while Wendell did the best he could with it until the engine grenaded. This resulted in Wendell obtaining a result of 22nd place DNF on lap 283.

South Carolina's blue laws were in full force during the era of the race. The pace car driver was Robert "Bob" Colvin who nearly got arrested for violating the "blue laws" before he found out that they were for someone else's bad checks.

In addition to watching the event live, NASCAR followers who either lived or visited the Concord, North Carolina region could listen to it on their transistor radios.

Race report
Amateur home video helped capture the most important 49 minutes of this event. Three cautions were waved for 24 laps. More than 80,000 spectators would see Buddy Baker defeat Bobby Allison by 24 seconds at speeds averaging . The pole position speed would be . Jim Vandiver would become the last-place finisher due to a transmission problem on lap 11.

James Hylton became the lowest-finishing driver to finish this race. Richard Petty would suffer an engine problem. His first win from the World 600 (now Coca-Cola 600) series of racing events would come in 1975. Larry Smith, who would go on to become NASCAR's Rookie of the Year, finished sixth in this race. A Rookie of the Year from 1957, Ken Rush, would make his final NASCAR Cup Series appearance in this event. He would make a 29th-place finish out of a 31st place start.

Out of the 40-car grid, all except Formula 1 driver Jackie Oliver were born in the United States. Oliver was born in Walton-on-Thames, England.

Notable crew chiefs included Harry Hyde, Dale Inman, Tom Vandiver, Darrell Bryant, and Lee Gordon.

Qualifying

Finishing order
Section reference: 

 Buddy Baker† (#11)
 Bobby Allison (#12)
 Charlie Glotzbach (#6)
 Benny Parsons† (#72)
 LeeRoy Yarbrough† (#45)
 Larry Smith† (#92)
 Buddy Arrington (#67)
 Cecil Gordon† (#24)
 Frank Warren (#79)
 Ben Arnold (#76)
 Elmo Langley† (#64)
 Ron Keselowski (#88)
 Raymond Williams (#47)
 Jabe Thomas (#25)
 Walter Ballard (#30)
 Jim Paschal*† (#27)
 Dean Dalton (#7)
 Fred Lorenzen* (#28)
 Richard Petty* (#43)
 James Hylton† (#48)
 Joe Frasson*† (#18)
 Wendell Scott*† (#34)
 Bobby Isaac*† (#71)
 John Sears*† (#4)
 David Pearson* (#21)
 Bill Champion*† (#10)
 Clarence Lovell* (#61)
 Coo Coo Marlin*† (#14)
 Ken Rush*† (#2)
 Richard D. Brown* (#91)
 Dave Marcis* (#16)
 Jackie Oliver* (#90)
 J.D. McDuffie*† (#70)
 Donnie Allison* (#15)
 Neil Castles* (#06)
 Dick Brooks*† (#73)
 Wayne Smith* (#33)
 David Ray Boggs* (#57)
 G.C. Spencer*† (#49)
 Jim Vandiver* (#31)

* Driver failed to finish race 
† signifies that the driver is known to be deceased

References

World 600
World 600
NASCAR races at Charlotte Motor Speedway